Open Agriculture is a peer-reviewed open access scientific journal covering research on all aspects of agriculture, horticulture, plant science, soil science, food science, and related topics. Occasionally, the journal publishes special issues on a specific topic. It is published by De Gruyter and the editors-in-chief are Hans Rudolf Herren (Millenium Institute) and Vijay P. Singh (Texas A&M University).

Abstracting and indexing
The journals is abstracted and indexed in:
AGRICOLA
EBSCO databases
Emerging Sources Citation Index
ProQuest databases
Scopus

References

External links

Agricultural journals
Publications established in 2016
English-language journals
Creative Commons Attribution-licensed journals
De Gruyter academic journals
Continuous journals